The Jagst is a right tributary of the Neckar in northern Baden-Württemberg. It is 190 km long. Its source is in the hills east of Ellwangen, close to the Bavarian border. It winds through the towns Ellwangen, Crailsheim, Kirchberg an der Jagst, Langenburg, Krautheim, Möckmühl and Neudenau. Near Bad Wimpfen the Jagst flows into the Neckar, a few km downstream from the mouth of the river Kocher, that flows more or less parallel to the Jagst.

To the south of the river is the Harthausen Forest.

Tributaries

The following rivers are tributaries to the river Jagst (from source to mouth):

Left: Rotenbach, Orrot, Klingenbach, Steinbach, Speltach, Maulach, Grundbach, Ginsbach, Sindelbach
Right: Röhlinger Sechta, Rechenberger Rot (Rotbach), Reiglersbach, Gronach, Brettach, Rötelbach, Ette, Erlenbach, Kessach, Hergstbach, Seckach, Schefflenz, Tiefenbach

See also
 List of rivers of Baden-Württemberg

References

Rivers of Baden-Württemberg
 
Rivers of Germany